The Battle of Tran or the Battle of Trun was a battle of the Serbo-Bulgarian War between the Moravian Division commanded by Petar Topalović against the Tran Detachment commanded by Nikola Genev.

The Battle
The battle began on the morning of November 3 between the vanguard of the Moravian Division and those taken to the peaks of Golemi Rui and Mali Rui, covering the Bulgarian companies. The serious resistance of the companies led the commander of the Moravian Division to introduce the 14th Serbian Infantry Regiment into battle, and later against the village of Turokovtsi was included the 2nd Company of the 2nd Serbian Infantry Regiment.

The Serbs, with considerable numerical superiority, resumed the offensive. The 2nd and 4th companies of the 3rd Bdina Regiment opposed the pressure on the northern flank. However, the Serbs reached the trenches and went into hand-to-hand combat. The officers personally lead their soldiers. Platoon commander Georgi Tonev, gave the command "Forward!", "Hurray!", And the whole platoon followed the example of their commander. This resulted in massive damage was inflicted on the Serbian front lines and the offensive was stopped.

The Moravian Division retreated to the peak of Golemi Rui, and its artillery occupied firing positions in the area of ​​the villages of Zabel and Turokovtsi.

In the evening at 11 pm, the commander of the Tran detachment, Nikola Genev, received an order, due to the retreat of the Serbian positions near Vrabcha and the detachment also began to retreat to the Trun-Breznik road as Milan I offered to begin peace negotiations.

References

Bibliography 
 
 Христов, Х. и др., Сръбско-българската война 1885. Сборник документи, Sofia, 1985, Военно издателство

Conflicts in 1885
Battles involving Bulgaria
Battles involving Serbia
1885 in Bulgaria
Serbo-Bulgarian War
History of Pernik Province
November 1885 events